This is a list of destinations that were served by British Midland International over its time as an airline.

On 28 October 2012, all remaining services were merged into British Airways (BA).

See also 
bmibaby
BMI Regional

Notes

References 

Lists of airline destinations
Destinations